Lazo Lipovski (born 27 March 1966) is a Macedonian football manager and former goalkeeper.

Playing career

Club
He started playing with FK Krofma Strumica before being brought by Serbian giants FK Partizan in 1983. He stayed in Belgrade with Partizan until 1986 however he made no league appearance and spent most time as reserve goalkeeper. During the winter-break of the 1985–86 season, he, along two other Partizan players, Slobodan Krčmarević and Ljubiša Milačić, joined FK Bor, playing in the Yugoslav Second League. But at the end of the season, he left Bor and joined FK Pobeda. Between 1987 and 1989 he spent two seasons playing with another Serbian club, OFK Kikinda.  In 1990, he returned to Macedonia and joined FK Skopje playing at that time in the Yugoslav third level. In 1992, he moved to Switzerland and played 3 seasons with FC Winterthur until summer 1995.  He then returned to Macedonia, which by then had become independent, and played with FK Sloga Jugomagnat in the Macedonian First League. In 1998, he joined FC Anzhi Makhachkala and played the following two seasons in the Russian First Division. In the seasons 2000 and 2001 besides being registered in the squad, he became also the teams goalkeeping coach. He finished his playing career because of a serious clash that provoked him a knee injury.

International
He had been part of the Macedonia national football team on three occasions, in two games for the 1996 EURO qualifiers, and one game for the 1998 World Cup qualifiers, however, in all those three occasions, Lipovski had been an unused substitute goalkeeper.

Football administration
After retiring, Lipovski was for a time president of Macedonian club FK Karaorman from Struga, and was also the sports director of FC Anzhi Makhachkala between February 21 and June 2, 2014.

References

1966 births
Living people
Sportspeople from Struga
Association football goalkeepers
Yugoslav footballers
Macedonian footballers
FK Partizan players
FK Bor players
FK Pobeda players
OFK Kikinda players
FK Skopje players
FC Winterthur players
FK Sloga Jugomagnat players
FC Anzhi Makhachkala players
Yugoslav First League players
Yugoslav Second League players
Swiss Challenge League players
Macedonian First Football League players
Russian First League players
Macedonian expatriate footballers
Expatriate footballers in Switzerland
Macedonian expatriate sportspeople in Switzerland
Expatriate footballers in Russia
Macedonian expatriate sportspeople in Russia